Artiom Litveacov (born 26 October 1996) is a Moldovan footballer who plays as a defender for Sfîntul Gheorghe.

References

External links

1996 births
Living people
People from Bender, Moldova
Moldovan footballers
Moldova international footballers
Moldovan expatriate footballers
Expatriate footballers in Uzbekistan
Expatriate footballers in Belarus
Moldovan expatriate sportspeople in Uzbekistan
Association football forwards
Moldovan Super Liga players
Uzbekistan Super League players
FC Dinamo-Auto Tiraspol players
FC Tighina players
Speranța Nisporeni players
FK Andijon players
FC Sfîntul Gheorghe players
FC Dynamo Brest players